Giuseppe Santagostino (18 March 1901 – 1 April 1955) was an Italian professional footballer and manager who played as a striker.

He ranks eighth in AC Milan's all-time goalscorers list, and has been inducted into the club's Hall of Fame.

Notably, Santagostino scored the first goal ever at the San Siro.

Career statistics 

Sources

Honours

Individual
AC Milan Hall of Fame

References

External links 
 Giuseppe Santagostino at MagliaRossonera.it

1901 births
1955 deaths
Italian footballers
Association football forwards
A.C. Milan players
Atalanta B.C. players